Charles Nii Armah Mensah Jr., (born 17 October 1984) is a Ghanaian reggae-dancehall artist. He is known by his stage name Shatta Wale, formerly Bandana. His best-known singles are "Dancehall King", "My level" and "We taking over" .He is also known for Already  from Beyoncé's Black is King Album which featured Major Lazer. His song "Dancehall King" earned him the Artiste of the Year at the 2014 edition of the Vodafone Ghana Music Awards. Wale is also an actor who appeared in the films Never Say Never, The trial of Shatta Wale and Shattered Lives. Wale's 2004 recording "Moko Hoo" was nominated for a Ghana Music Award.

In 2014, he peaked to number 38 on E.tv's "Top 100 Most Influential Ghanaian" Awards chart. He has since then appeared on the chart every year. He was ranked "Most Influential Musician" on social media in 2017. He made a record-setting as a dancehall artist to have won 11 awards at the 2019 3 Music Awards ceremony.

Early life 
Charles Nii Armah Mensah Jr. was born in Accra, Ghana at the Police Hospital on 17 October 1984 to Charles Nii Armah Mensah Snr and Elsie Evelyn Avemegah. His father is a politician, businessman and legal practitioner.

Shatta Wale attended Seven Great Princes Academy at Dansoman, a suburb in Accra, where he demonstrated an affinity for arts and acted in a popular drama series, By the Fireside, at the National Theatre of Ghana. He then continued to the Winneba Secondary School where he obtained his second cycle education.He started his young music career with borrowed name and identity-Doggy- a name he took in reverence of his favourite DanceHall artiste at the time- Yoggy Doggy.

Then he changed to Bandana- a name that shot him to fame after a single hit track. He died in music, buried for years, only to resurrect with a new name, Shatta Wale, a new identity  and a solid repertoire of hits after hits.

2019–2020 
In 2019 he also had a collaboration with Beyoncé titled “Already” on her album The Lion King: The Gift which was nominated at the Grammy Awards.

2021- 
In 2021, he was nominated for two awards and won the 'Best Virtual Entertainer of the Year' Award at the International Reggae and World Music Awards (IRAWMA).

Concerts 
He was the first Ghanaian to organize a digital concert on YouTube which was dubbed the Faith Concert. The concert was organized to bring hope to Ghanaians and his global audience at large during the fight against COVID-19 pandemic.
He was selected by The Ministry of Communications, Ghana, alongside Highlife musician Kuami Eugene as the headline artistes for the COVID-19 app virtual launch concert held on Monday April 13, 2020. On Saturday 17 October 2020, he threw a massive birthday party, which saw attendance by family and friends at his East Legon residence to mark his 36th birthday.

Accolades 
Mayor of Worcester, Joseph Petty, presented Shatta Wale with the Key to the City on 8 July 2017.

On 18 March 2018, Wale was presented an honoree award for his contribution to reggae in Ghana at the 37th Annual Chicago Music Awards (CMA), in conjunction with the 36th International Reggae & World Music Awards (IRAWMA).

Endorsements 
In 2014, Wale became a brand ambassador for Guinness Ghana Breweries. and as the brand ambassador for Rush Energy Drink.

In September 2017, Kasapreko Company, producers of several alcoholic and non-alcoholic beverages in Ghana, unveiled Wale as their newest brand ambassador for Storm Energy Drink.

On 17 November 2017, Shatta Wale signed a deal with Boss Baker Beef Roll as the brand ambassador.
Infinix Ghana, a smartphone company, on Wednesday, September 11, 2019, announced Shatta Wale as its Brand Ambassador

Controversy 
In October 2021, Shatta Wale allegedly created a hoax that he was shot and was receiving treatments. He later turned himself in due to the police declaring him wanted.  He was arrested by the Ghana Police Service for allegedly involving in the creation and circulation of information to create fear and panic. He was remanded into prison custody for a week. On Tuesday, 26 October 2021, Shatta Wale was granted a GH¢100,000 self-recognizance bail at today's hearing. The case has been adjourned to November 9, 2021. A fortnight after the artist was released on bail, he got caught in another confrontation with the Police as he stormed out of meeting with celebrities called at the behest of Ghana's Police Chief. Shatta Wale complained of unfair treatment at the meeting after all his colleagues were allegedly allowed to use their phones and he was not. He later reported to the meeting and knelt before the IGP George Akuffo Dampare to ask for forgiveness.

Discography

Albums 
 After the Storm (2016)
 Cloud 9 (2017, hip hop mixtape)
 Reign (2018)
 Wonder Boy (2019)

Singles

Videography

Filmography

Awards and nominations 
In 2014, Shatta Wale was nominated for the Maiden GN Bank Awards as the People's Choice Male Musician of the year.

References 

 Shatta Wale – Made In Ghana  iChris Ghana
 Shatta Wale – Sleepless night  Ghpops Ghana

External links 
 Twitter

1984 births
Living people
Dancehall singers
Ghanaian record producers
People from Accra
Reggae singers